Finn Erling Kydland (born 1 December 1943) is a Norwegian economist known for his contributions to business cycle theory. He is the Henley Professor of Economics at the University of California, Santa Barbara. He also holds the Richard P. Simmons Distinguished Professorship at the Tepper School of Business of Carnegie Mellon University, where he earned his PhD, and a part-time position at the Norwegian School of Economics (NHH). Kydland was a co-recipient of the 2004 Nobel Memorial Prize in Economics, with Edward C. Prescott, "for their contributions to dynamic macroeconomics: the time consistency of economic policy and the driving forces behind business cycles."

Biography

Early years
Kydland grew up as the eldest of six siblings at the family farm in Søyland, Gjesdal, which is located in the Jæren farming region in Rogaland county, southwestern Norway. He recalls having had a liberal upbringing, his parents not imposing many limitations on their children. Finn Kydland became interested in mathematics and economics as a young adult, after he did some bookkeeping at a friend's mink farm.

With a freshly awakened interest in theoretical economics, Kydland earned a BSc from NHH in 1968 and a PhD in economics from Carnegie Mellon in 1973, dissertation: Decentralized Macroeconomic Planning, supervised by Edward C. Prescott. After his PhD he returned to NHH as an assistant professor.  In 1978 he moved back to Carnegie Mellon as an associate professor.  He has been living in the United States since then.

Scholarship
Kydland's areas of expertise are economics in general and political economy. His main areas of teaching and interest are business cycles, monetary and fiscal policy and labor economics.  He joined the faculty of Carnegie Mellon University in 1977, where he served as a Professor of Economics until 2004, when he became a faculty member of the University of California, Santa Barbara and founded the Laboratory for Aggregate Economics and Finance (LAEF) at this same institution. He is a Research Associate for the Federal Reserve Banks of Dallas, Cleveland and St. Louis, and a Fellow at the IC² Institute at the University of Texas at Austin. He is also an adjunct professor at the NHH, and has held visiting scholar and professor positions at, among other places, the Hoover Institution and the Universidad Torcuato di Tella in Buenos Aires, Argentina.

Personal life
Kydland married Liv Kjellevold in 1968, with whom he had four children; sons, Eirik, Jon Martin, and daughters, Camilla and Kari. He is now married to Tonya Schooler.

Honours and awards
 Bank of Sweden Prize in Economic Sciences in Memory of Alfred Nobel (2004)
 Fellow, Econometric Society (1992– )
 John Stauffer National Fellowship, Hoover Institution (1982–1983)
 Alexander Henderson Award, Carnegie Mellon (1973)
 Member of the Norwegian Academy of Science and Letters.
 International Chamber of Commerce Oslo Business for Peace Award 2017

References

External links
 Faculty information from University of California, Santa Barbara 
 Faculty information from Carnegie Mellon Tepper School of Business 
  including the Prize Lecture on December 8, 2004 Quantitative Aggregate Theory
 Econometric Society
  Alexander Henderson Award
 

1943 births
Living people
Tepper School of Business alumni
Carnegie Mellon University faculty
New classical economists
Fellows of the Econometric Society
Macroeconomists
Nobel laureates in Economics
Members of the Norwegian Academy of Science and Letters
Norwegian Nobel laureates
Norwegian School of Economics alumni
Academic staff of the Norwegian School of Economics
University of California, Santa Barbara faculty
20th-century Norwegian economists
21st-century Norwegian economists
National Bureau of Economic Research
People from Gjesdal